"Little Bird" is a song by American rock band the Beach Boys from their 1968 album Friends. It was credited to Dennis Wilson and Stephen Kalinich, however, it was written primarily by Brian Wilson, who declined a songwriting credit. The track was placed as the B-side of the album's "Friends" single, which peaked at number 47 in the US and number 25 in the UK.

Background
Brian recalled; "Dennis gave us 'Little Bird' which blew my mind because it was so full of spiritualness. He was a late bloomer as a music maker. He lived hard and rough but his music was as sensitive as anyone's." The outro of "Little Bird" features music reworked from Brian's unfinished 1966 composition "Child Is Father of the Man", originally intended for the Smile album. Brian's contribution remains uncredited.

According to Kalinich, Brian wrote virtually all of the composition. "I always claimed Brian wrote the bridge and changed my words around, but he also changed the whole melody. I talked to Brian recently and he said, 'Well, I touched it up, arranged it and produced it.' So he calls that an arrangement, but it's really a rewrite. Brian didn't take credit. He was trying to help his little brother."

Reception
Matthew Greenwald of AllMusic called the song a "wonderful surprise" from Dennis: "[his] earthy ability to capture his love of the power of nature is the basis for this minor masterpiece, and along with talented collaborator Steve Kalinich, he was able to nail his emotions."

Personnel
Per Craig Slowinski.

The Beach Boys
 Carl Wilson lead vocals, backing vocals
 Dennis Wilson lead vocals, backing vocals, harmonium
 Al Jardine backing vocals
 Bruce Johnston backing vocals
 Brian Wilson backing vocals

Session musicians
 Al Vescovo guitar, banjo
 Lyle Ritz electric & upright basses
 Jim Gordon drums, block & bell
 Roy Caton, Dick Forrest, Ollie Mitchell, Tony Terran trumpets
 Raymond Kelley, Jacqueline Lustgarden cellos

Cover versions

 2012 – Of Montreal

References

Bibliography

Further reading
 

1968 songs
The Beach Boys songs
Psychedelic pop songs
Songs written by Stephen Kalinich
Songs written by Dennis Wilson
Song recordings produced by the Beach Boys
Songs about birds